Orneore Metelli (1872-1938) was an Italian painter of the Naïve art style in his native Umbria.

Biography
He began painting at the age of 50 without any prior formal training. He had once been a trombonist for a band in his native Terni. He has awarded a prize at the Paris International Exhibition of 1911. The sculptor Aurelio De Felice in 1936, began earnest artistic critique of his work, after being brought to his attention by the painter Ugo Castellani. The simple canvases, often depicting sparsely populated cityscapes, according to De Felice stand as ''true, pure, spontaneous, full of energy, without calculation of purpose, without speculation, or internal imbroglios.

References

1872 births
1938 deaths
People from Terni
20th-century Italian painters
Italian male painters
20th-century Italian male artists